St Luke's Church is in the village of Goostrey, Cheshire, England.  It is recorded in the National Heritage List for England as a designated Grade II* listed building.  It is an active Anglican parish church in the diocese of Chester, the archdeaconry of Macclesfield and the deanery of Congleton.  Its benefice is combined with that of St Peter, Swettenham.

History
The parish of Goostrey is first mentioned in the Domesday Book and a church or chapel was present by 1244.  By 1617 a timber-framed chapel was present on the site which consisted of a nave and a chancel with a south aisle belonging to the Booths of Twemlow.  In 1667 another south aisle was constructed for Edmund Jodrell and this was enlarged in 1711.  In 1792 this chapel was demolished and the present church built between 1792 and 1796.

Parish of Goostrey
The ecclesiastical parish of Goostrey includes not only the civil parish of that name, but also that of Twemlow, named after the burial mounds or 'lows' found in this part of Cheshire, indicating that people lived here over four thousand years ago.  The first documented mention of Goostrey is in the Domesday Book (1086), when most of the parish was held by William Fitz Nigel, Baron of Halton, and by Hugh de Mara, another follower of the Earl of Chester. They gave much land in Goostrey to endow the new abbey of Saint Werburgh in Chester, and later land in the parish was given to help endow the Vale Royal Abbey, near Northwich.

The medieval history of the parish is recorded in grants and agreements which regulated the relations between the abbey at Chester and their local tenants. Occasionally these documents give an insight into the personal lives of the period.  For example, in 1286 Honde Merlun broke into the church at Goostrey and took away all the ornaments; or when five brothers of William Eaton of Blackden were slain together and buried in the chapelyard in 1385.

St Luke's Church
St Luke's Church, a Church of England church, was built before 1220, but it was not until 1350 that the mother church of Sandbach allowed burials here. The parishioners of Goostrey frequently found the way to Sandbach impassable because of floods and must have rejoiced when the five mile (8 km) journey across the Rivers Dane and Croco was no longer necessary. The old church was timber framed, as Marton still is today, but all that remains from the Middle Ages of that church is the 15th-century font.

Three of the bells rang in the old building; the oldest was cast in 1606, the next recast in 1705, when the work cost £5, and the third a little later. Of the other three, two were given in 1869 by Anna Maria Toler in memory of Mrs Thomas Hilditch, and the third is modern, dated 1912. The present ring consists of six bells, two of which were cast in 1869 at the Whitechapel Bell Foundry by Mears & Stainbank, and the rest are by James Barwell, dated 1913.  The organ was built in 1876 by Wadsworth.

Some of the communion plates are 18th-century, and in 1719 a silver paten was given by Miss Dorothy Jodrell. It was made in London in 1715 by Samuel Wastell. A chalice and flagon, towards which Randle Armstrong gave £20 in 1759, were made in that year by Fuller White of London. There is a modern paten, dated 1902, made in London, and there is a modern chalice given in memory of Sarah Elizabeth Knowles, made in Sheffield and dated 1931.

Parish records
The parish registers, which are well preserved, date back to 1561. They contain a few interesting notes, such as one in 1661 when Marie Worthington, the wife of the minister of Goostrey, died, and after the entry is written the word 'scould' in a different ink.  Another note among the next year's burials tells that Mr Whishall 'married five wives,' and later, in 1674, when James Dean married Margaret Hall, we read that she was his third wife 'all within the year'. At the back of the volume, among a list of notices relating to collections made in the chapelry, are documented donations sent to towns like Ripon in Yorkshire or Bridgnorth in Shropshire, as well as one contribution sent to Hugh Evans 'having his house and his household goods burnt in the county of Salop'. The registers also document how everyone agreed to the appointment of Mr Henry Newcome as minister on 7 October 1648, and it seems that even into the 18th century the inhabitants had some say in which clergyman was given the living of Goostrey, even though the final decision must have rested then as now with the vicar of Sandbach. Mr Newcome was a strict puritan, and forbade two of his most prominent parishioners from coming to Holy Communion for their frequent drinking. He left after eighteen months to become Rector of Gawsworth.

The Churchwarden's Accounts are preserved from 1638 and explain the economics of parish life in other days.  For example, in 1661, the font could be releaded for thirteen shillings, or a clock bought for two pounds three shillings and nine pence in 1658. Some things seem very cheap, as when the royal arms were painted and erected for two pounds three shillings and eight pence, and some very expensive, as when the book containing the new Communion Service of 1662, was purchased at a cost of twelve shillings, at a time when a labourer's weekly wage would not be much above half a crown. Sometimes information about the bill is scarce, as when the church was restored in 1711 at a cost of forty six pounds.  Other account examples include 5000 bricks for two pounds five shillings in 1750.

Construction
In 1792 it was decided to build, at a cost of £1,700, a new church to the design of the village bricksetter, as the old timber church was very cold. No doubt the continual repairing and the alterations when new aisles were added to accommodate the gentry had made a thorough rebuilding necessary, but the 18th century was no respector of ancient buildings. However, they did leave the old yew tree.

In 1876 the church was restored and the interior re-furnished. It seems likely that the pulpit, lectern and sanctuary panelling were put in then. A new organ was given and a console in 1947 when the pipes were moved to the gallery. In 1961 a new altar was given and other furniture for the chancel which was rearranged to give more space between the choir pews.

The stained glass, which may aptly be called post-Raphaelite, dates from about 1876; the east window being given in memory of Egerton Leigh, the second of that name to live at Jodrell Hall, the south west window being in memory of Mary Susan Armitstead, the young wife of William George, vicar of Goostrey from 1860 to 1907. They married in 1865; she died in 1868.

Churchyard
There are two listed buildings in the churchyard: a sundial dated 1798 with a gnomon dated 1999, and a table tomb near the east end of the church. There is also a war memorial near the churchyard gate. 
The churchyard also contains the war grave of a Canadian soldier of World War I.

Schools
Across from the church is Goostrey Primary School. The earliest reference to a school is in 1640 when it was repaired. It was then next to the north wall of the churchyard where the old vicarage now stands, in a house which was also used as the court house for Goostrey Manor. This appears to have been pulled down in 1703. It may be then that the pupils moved across to the old school house, which is one of the oldest buildings in the village. In 1856 the main part of the present buildings were erected when the old days of a schoolmaster who was also the parish clerk came to an end. The last of these schoolmasters, Jonathan Harding (1781–1862), is buried by the west end of the church; he had held his office for fifty two years. In 1977 the building of a new infants' department across the main road was undertaken. With this the old connection of church and school has been severed.

People of Goostrey
John Hulse, incumbent in the village from 1735 to 1754, left money to Cambridge University to found a professorial chair, which is still known by his name. Some families have achieved parochial renown by their memorials in church. The Kinseys whose last male representative died in 1814, acquired land here about 1380 by marrying one of the heiresses of the last Goostrey. The Armitsteads, who provided four vicars of Goostrey, three successively from 1859 to 1923, came from Horton in Ribblesdale in the middle of the 18th century Lawrence, whose memorial is on the north wall, purchased the Hermitage and Cranage estates. The Baskervyles whose memorials are in the north east corner of the chancel were squires of nearby Withington Hall from 1266 until 1954 when John Baskerville Glegg was buried at the east end of the church with his ancestors. On the south wall we read of the Booth family who lived at Twemlow Hall. The Booths originated from Barton near Manchester and were a family of note in the North West by the 15th century. Through marriage with a Venables heiress they acquired Dunham Massey and later a cadet branch by marriage with a Knutsford heiress obtained part of Twemlow whilst the other Knutsford heiress married a Jodrell from Yeardsley who obtained the other part. A Jodrell heiress in 1778 married Egerton Leigh of West Hall, High Legh, and in 1863 their grandson Colonel Egerton Leigh bought the other  of the Twemlow Manor estate from the Booths. Leigh family sold most of their Jodrell and surrounding estates in 1924.

Today most of the land here is owned by the families who farm it, though at the north east corner of Goostrey, Manchester University owns land where their radio telescope, Jodrell Bank, overlooks a collection of Neolithic barrows.

See also

Grade II* listed buildings in Cheshire East
Listed buildings in Goostrey

References

External links
Goostrey Village Website
Photographs by Craig Thornber

History of Cheshire
Church of England church buildings in Cheshire
Grade II* listed churches in Cheshire
Neoclassical architecture in Cheshire
Churches completed in 1796
Diocese of Chester
1796 establishments in England
Neoclassical church buildings in England